David Lagerquist became editor-in-chief of CLOAD Magazine in July 1980. That month he also started Chromasette. In an October 1981 version of Chromasette, Dave first coined the term "Coco" for the TRS-80 Color Computer.

References

American magazine editors
Year of birth missing (living people)
Living people
Place of birth missing (living people)